Luca Raggio (born 26 March 1995) is an Italian former professional cyclist, who rode professionally from 2018 to 2020 for the  and  teams.

Major results
2017
 3rd Ruota d'Oro
 4th Coppa della Pace
 5th Gran Premio Industrie del Marmo
 5th GP Capodarco
 8th Trofeo Edil C
 10th Overall Giro Ciclistico d'Italia

References

External links

1995 births
Living people
Italian male cyclists
People from Chiavari
Sportspeople from the Province of Genoa
Cyclists from Liguria
20th-century Italian people
21st-century Italian people